Cory-Rawson High School is a public high school in Rawson, Ohio.  It is the only high school in the Cory-Rawson Schools district.  It is named for the villages of Mount Cory and Rawson.  Their nickname is the Hornets.  School colors are green and gold.  They are a member of the Blanchard Valley Conference.

Ohio High School Athletic Association State Championships
 Girls Track and Field – 1997

References

External links
 District Website

High schools in Hancock County, Ohio
Public high schools in Ohio